The 2008 Nebraska Cornhuskers baseball team was Mike Anderson's sixth year as head coach. The Cornhuskers played their home games at Hawks Field.

Preseason 
Potential, Promise, Proven is the Huskers motto for the year. While 8 pitchers from 2007 left for the draft, the 2008 Cornhuskers team is the youngest for Mike Anderson with 15 newcomers plus 5 of last years redshirts. Nebraska plays 8 teams that made the 2007 NCAA tournament including 5 one seeds. The baseball team was picked to finish sixth in the Big 12 by a vote of the league coaches with 36 points and no first place votes.

Roster

Schedule 

! style="" | Regular Season
|- valign="top" 

|- align="left" bgcolor="FFBBBB"
|Feb. 22 || Stanford || Palo Alto, California || Bleich (1-0) || Weber (0-1) || || L 7-17 || 0-1 
|- align="left" bgcolor="#bbffbb"
|Feb. 22 || Stanford || Palo Alto, California || Dorn (1-0) || Davis (0-1) ||  || W 9-2 || 1-1
|- align="left" bgcolor="#bbbbbb"
|Feb. 23 || Stanford ||colspan=8|Postponed (rain)
|- align="left" bgcolor="FFBBBB"
|Feb. 24 || Stanford || Palo Alto, California || Inman (1-0) || Bird (0-1) || Stringer (1) || L 2-4 || 1-2
|- align="left" bgcolor="bbffbb"
|Feb. 29 ||  || Hawks Field || Anderson (1-0) || Penney (0-1) ||  || W 3-2  || 2-2
|-

|- align="left" bgcolor="bbffbb"
|Mar. 1 || UC Riverside || Hawks Field || Jennings (1-0)  || Larkins (1-1) ||  || W 10-4 || 3-2
|- align="left" bgcolor="#bbffbb"
|Mar. 1 || UC Riverside || Hawks Field || Weber (1-1) || Applebee (0-2) || Nesseth (1) || W 5-2 || 4-2
|- align="left" bgcolor="#bbffbb"
|Mar. 2 || UC Riverside || Hawks Field || Pribanic (1-0) || Orozco (0-1) || || W 13-1 (7) || 5-2
|- align="left" bgcolor="#bbffbb"
|Mar. 4 ||  || Hawks Field ||  Hatasaki (1-0)|| Wrobel (1-3) ||  || W 11-2 || 6-2
|- align="left" bgcolor="#bbffbb"
|Mar. 8 ||  || Hawks Field || Dorn (2-0) || Reap (1-1) || || W 12-2 || 7-2
|- align="left" bgcolor="#bbffbb"
|Mar. 9 || Northern Colorado || Hawks Field || Nesseth (1-0) || Peery (1-2) || Anderson (1) || W 3-2 || 8-2
|- align="left" bgcolor="#bbffbb"
|Mar. 9 || Northern Colorado || Hawks Field || Weber (2-1) || Kazell (0-1) || Herr (1) || W 8-5 || 9-2
|- align="left" bgcolor="#bbffbb"
|Mar. 10 || Northern Colorado || Hawks Field || Pribanic (2-0) || Keating (2-1) || || W 7-0 || 10-2
|- align="left" bgcolor="#bbffbb"
|Mar. 11 ||  || Hawks Field || Mariot (1-0) || Johnson (0-2) || || W 7-3 || 11-2
|- align="left" bgcolor="#bbffbb"
|Mar. 14 ||  || Manhattan, Kansas || Herr (1-0) || Hoge (0-1) || Anderson (2) || W 2-1 || 12-2 (1-0)
|- align="left" bgcolor="#bbffbb"
|Mar. 15 || Kansas State || Manhattan, Kansas || Weber (3-1) || Bayuk (0-2) || || W 11-4 || 13-2 (2-0)
|- align="left" bgcolor="#bbffbb"
|Mar. 16 || Kansas State || Manhattan, Kansas || Nesseth (2-0) || Edwards (1-2) || Anderson (3) || W 5-3 (10) || 14-2 (3-0)
|- align="left" bgcolor="#bbffbb"
|Mar. 18 ||  || Hawks Field || Jennings (2-0) || Korbal (0-3) || || W 6-1 || 15-2 (3-0)
|- align="left" bgcolor="FFBBBB"
|Mar. 19 || Arkansas || Hawks Field || Richards (1-0) || Nesseth (2-1) || || L 4-9 || 15-3 (3-0)
|- align="left" bgcolor="#bbffbb"
|Mar. 21 ||  || Hawks Field || Herr (2-0) || Duke (3-2) || || W 4-2 || 16-3 (4-0)
|- align="left" bgcolor="#bbffbb"
|Mar. 22 || Oklahoma || Hawks Field || Weber (4-1) || Doyle (4-2) || Nesseth (2)|| W 4-3 || 17-3 (5-0)
|- align="left" bgcolor="ffffff"
|Mar. 23 || Oklahoma || Hawks Field ||  ||  || || Tie 8-8 (10) || 17-3-1 (5-0-1)
|- align="left" bgcolor="#bbffbb"
|Mar. 25 || Northern Colorado || Hawks Field || Jennings (3-0) || Klausing (1-3) || || W 10-0 || 18-3-1 (5-0-1)
|- align="left" bgcolor="#bbffbb"
|Mar. 26 || Northern Colorado || Hawks Field || Bird (1-1) || Banks (0-3) || || W 9-4 ||  19-3-1 (5-0-1)
|- align="left" bgcolor="#bbffbb"
|Mar. 28 ||  || Austin, Texas || Dorn (3-0) || Shinaberry (1-1) || Jennings (1) || W 14-4 || 20-3-1 (6-0-1)
|- align="left" bgcolor="#bbffbb"
|Mar. 29 || Texas || Austin, Texas || Weber (5-1) || Wood (2-2) || || W 2-0 || 21-3-1 (7-0-1)
|- align="left" bgcolor="FFBBBB"
|Mar. 30 || Texas || Austin, Texas || Boening (2-0) || Pribanic (2-1) || Green (1) || L 12-3 || 21-4-1 (7-1-1)
|-

|- align="left" bgcolor="#bbbbbb"
|April 1 ||  ||   colspan=8|Postponed until April 23 (Cold Weather)
|- align="left" bgcolor="#bbffbb"
|April 4 ||  || Hawks Field || Dorn (4-0) || Karns (1-5) || || W 6-2 || 22-4-1 (8-1-1)
|- align="left" bgcolor="#bbffbb"
|April 5 || Texas Tech || Hawks Field || Weber (6-1) || Ramos (1-3) || Jennings (2) || W 5-2 || 23-4-1 (9-1-1)
|- align="left" bgcolor="#bbffbb"
|April 6 || Texas Tech || Hawks Field || Pribanic (4-1) || Bettis (3-2) || Jennings (3) || W 5-3 || 24-4-1 (10-1-1)
|- align="left" bgcolor="#bbbbbb"
|April 8 ||  || colspan=8|Canceled (Cold Weather)
|- align="left" bgcolor="FFBBBB"
|April 11 ||  || Stillwater, Oklahoma || Oliver (3-2) || Dorn (4-1) || || L 0-1 || 24-5-1 (10-2-1)
|- align="left" bgcolor="FFBBBB"
|April 12 || Oklahoma State || Stillwater, Oklahoma || Lyons (6-2) || Weber (6-2) || || L 2-19 || 24-6-1 (10-3-1)
|- align="left" bgcolor="#bbffbb"
|April 13 || Oklahoma State || Stillwater, Oklahoma || Jennings (4-0) || Blanford (3-3) || || W 14-5 || 25-6-1 (11-3-1)
|- align="left" bgcolor="#bbffbb"
|April 15 || Wichita State || Hawks Field || Bird (2-1) || Kelley (4-2) || Herr (2) || W 3-0 || 26-6-1 (11-3-1)
|- align="left" bgcolor="#bbffbb"
|April 18 ||  || Hawks Field || Dorn (5-1) || Czyz (2-4) || Jennings (4) || W 7-6 || 27-6-1 (12-3-1)
|- align="left" bgcolor="#bbffbb"
|April 19 || Kansas || Hawks Field || Weber (7-2) || Esquibel (3-3) || Herr (3) || W 8-6 || 28-6-1 (13-3-1)
|- align="left" bgcolor="FFBBBB"
|April 20 || Kansas || Hawks Field || Walz (3-0) || Pribanic (3-2) || Smyth (7) || L 3-6 || 28-7-1 (13-4-1)
|- align="left" bgcolor="#bbffbb"
|April 22 || Creighton || Hawks Field || Jennings (5-0) || Hauer (6-2) || Nesseth (3) || W 4-3 || 29-7-1 (13-4-1)
|- align="left" bgcolor="#bbffbb"
|April 23 || Creighton || Rosenblatt Stadium || Mariot (2-0) || Moore (4-5) ||  || W 16-7 || 30-7-1 (13-4-1)
|- align="left" bgcolor="#bbbbbb"
|April 25 ||  || colspan=8|Postponed until April 26 (Rain)
|- align="left" bgcolor="#bbffbb"
|April 26 || Baylor || Waco, Texas || Nesseth (3-1) || Kenpf (5-2) || Herr (4) || W 6-4 (10) || 31-7-1 (14-4-1)
|- align="left" bgcolor="#bbffbb"
|April 26 || Baylor || Waco, Texas || Weber (8-2) || Tolleson (4-3) || || W 14-1 (7) || 32-7-1 (15-4-1)
|- align="left" bgcolor="FFBBBB"
|April 27 || Baylor || Waco, Texas || Kempf (6-2) || Pribanic (3-3) || Thurman (2) || L 3-8 || 32-8-1 (15-5-1)
|- align="left" bgcolor="#bbffbb"
|April 29 ||  || Hawks Field || Hauptman (1-0) || Percival (1-6) || Nesseth (4) || W 6-4 || 33-8-1 (15-5-1)
|- align="left" bgcolor="#bbffbb"
|April 30 || Western Illinois || Hawks Field || Bird (3-1) || Zenesek (1-2) || || W 6-1 || 34-8-1 (15-5-1)
|-

|- align="left" bgcolor="#bbbbbb"
|May 2 || Louisiana–Lafayette || colspan=8|Canceled (Rain)
|- align="left" bgcolor="#bbffbb"
|May 3 || Louisiana-Lafayette || Hawks Field || Herr (3-0) || Glass (2-3) || || W 4-3 || 35-8-1 (15-5-1)
|- align="left" bgcolor="#bbffbb"
|May 3 || Louisiana-Lafayette || Hawks Field || Bird (4-1) || Harmon (1-2) || || W 4-3 (14) || 36-8-1 (15-5-1)
|- align="left" bgcolor="FFBBBB"
|May 9 ||  || Hawks Field || Starling (8-0) || Jennings (5-1) || || L 3-6 (16) || 36-9-1 (15-6-1)
|- align="left" bgcolor="#bbbbbb"
|May 10 || Texas A&M || colspan=8|Postponed until May 11 (Rain)
|- align="left" bgcolor="#bbffbb"
|May 11 || Texas A&M || Hawks Field || Jennings (6-1) || Thebeau (5-3) || || W 9-8 || 37-9-1 (16-6-1)
|- align="left" bgcolor="#bbffbb"
|May 11 || Texas A&M || Hawks Field || Nesseth (4-1) || Minks (4-1) || || W 13-10 || 38-9-1 (17-6-1)
|- align="left" bgcolor="#bbffbb"
|May 13 || Creighton || Rosenblatt Stadium || Bird (5-1) || Hellhake (3-1) || Hauptman (1) || W 8-1 || 39-9-1 (17-6-1)
|- align="left" bgcolor="FFBBBB"
|May 16 || Missouri || Columbia, Missouri || Crow (12-0) || Jennings (6-2) || || L 8-1 || 39-10-1 (17-7-1)
|- align="left" bgcolor="FFBBBB"
|May 17 || Missouri || Columbia, Missouri || Berger (4-4) || Weber (8-3) || Allen (2) || L 22-9 || 39-11-1 (17-8-1)
|- align="left" bgcolor="FFBBBB"
|May 18 || Missouri || Columbia, Missouri || Zagone (2-3) || Pribanic (3-4) || Gibson (2) || L 3-7 ||  39-12-1 (17-9-1)
|-

|-
! style="" | Postseason
|- valign="top"

|- align="left" bgcolor="FFBBBB"
|May 21 || Baylor || Oklahoma City || Tolleson (6-4) || Jennings (6-3) || Kempf (2) || L 4-10 || 39-13-1
|- align="left" bgcolor="#bbffbb"
|May 23 || Kansas State || Oklahoma City || Dorn (6-1) || Bayuk (1-5) || Herr (5) || W 5-2 || 40-13-1
|- align="left" bgcolor="FFBBBB"
|May 24 || Oklahoma State || Oklahoma City || Lyons (11-2) || Weber (8-4) || Weinhardt (4) || L 5-11 || 40-14-1
|-

|-
|

Season Facts 
 Johnny Dorn's 13 Strike out game against Northern Colorado is his career high.
 Aaron Pribanic threw back to back complete games against UC Riverside and Northern Colorado becoming the first Husker pitcher to toss consecutive complete games since Aaron Marsden in March 2003.
 The 14-game win streak Nebraska put together tied for the fourth-longest win streak in school history and the longest since a 15-game win streak in 2000. The Huskers’ streak fell two games shy of the Big 12 record of 16 set by Kansas State (2006) and Texas Tech (2002).
 The Tie against Oklahoma on March 23 was the first tie for Nebraska since 1996 and the fourth one in league games since the Big 12 established in 1996.
 The Huskers’ 5-0-1 start in Big 12 play is their best since the league was formed in 1997. The previous start was 5-1 on four occasions, most recently in 2005.

Awards 
 Mitch Abeita
 All-Big 12 First Team
 ABCA All-Midwest Region Team
 Craig Corriston
 Big 12 Player of the Week (03/17/2008)
 All-Big 12 Honorable Mention
 Johnny Dorn
 Big 12’s Co-Pitcher of the Week (03/10/2008)
 All-Big 12 First Team
 ABCA All-Midwest Region Second Team
 Third-Team All-American
 Dan Jennings
 All-Big 12 Honorable Mention
 Bryce Nimmo
 All-Big 12 Honorable Mention
 Jake Opitz
 All-Big 12 First Team
 ABCA All-Midwest Region Second Team
 Nick Sullivan
 Big 12 Player of the Week (03/24/2008)
 Thad Weber
 All-Big 12 Second Team

Rankings 

* USA Today/ESPN did not release a poll after the first weekend of play.

Huskers in the 2008 MLB Draft

References

External links
 Thursday Thoughts - Greetings from the future location of home plate for the CWS
 Friday First Takes - No "Sooner Magic"

Nebraska Cornhuskers Baseball Team, 2008
Nebraska Cornhuskers baseball seasons
Nebraska Cornhuskers baseball
Nebraska